"El Watan Al Djazairia" was an Arabic language satellite television channel broadcasting from Algeria. El Watan Al Djazairia was set up by Islamist party Hamas with a number of Arab intellectuals from Algeria and the Arab World.

History
El Watan Al Djazairia was founded on 20 February 2014, it has started to broadcast its programs on 20 February 2014.

Programs

 The economic angles
 Dossier

References

External links 
 elwatanmedia.ma

Arab mass media
Television in Algeria
Arabic-language television stations
Arabic-language television
Television channels and stations established in 2014
Television channels and stations disestablished in 2015
Television stations in Algeria
2014 establishments in Algeria
2015 disestablishments in Algeria